John Sweeny (May 6, 1821 – March 25, 1901) was an Irish born, Canadian Roman Catholic priest and Bishop of Saint John in New Brunswick from 1859 to 1901. 

John Sweeny was born in Clones, Co. Monaghan, Ireland in 1821, the son of James Sweeny and Mary McGuire. He was ordained a priest, for Fredericton (St. John), New Brunswick in 1844.

Bishop Sweeny was a leading figure in opposition to the Common Schools Act of 1871 enacted by the 22nd New Brunswick Legislative Assembly. He founded the Irish Catholic community of Johnville, New Brunswick.

References
 

1821 births
1901 deaths
19th-century Roman Catholic bishops in Canada
20th-century Roman Catholic bishops in Canada
People from County Monaghan
Roman Catholic bishops of Saint John, New Brunswick